Gurnee School District 56 is a PK-8 school district located in the northern Lake County village of Gurnee, Illinois. Gurnee School District 56 is composed of four schools, Spaulding School, Prairie Trail School, Viking School and River Trail School.

Schools

Spaulding School 
Spaulding School is an elementary school that serves pre-kindergarten through second grade. , the school's principal is Dr. Ellen Mauer.

Prairie Trail School 
Prairie Trail School is an elementary school that offers third grade through fifth grade. , the school's principal is Mr. Kevin Simmons.

Viking School 
Viking School is a middle school that offers sixth grade through eighth grade. , the school's principal is Mr. Ryan Lazar.

River Trail School 
River Trail School is a combined elementary and middle school that offers kindergarten through eighth grade. , the school's principal is Dr. Jennifer Glickley.

References

External links 
 

Gurnee, Illinois
School districts in Lake County, Illinois